Memento Mori (stylized as " | Mori" on the album cover) is the upcoming fifteenth studio album by Depeche Mode (stylized as "|MODE" on the album cover), set to be released on 24 March 2023, through Columbia and Mute. The album was produced by James Ford and Marta Salogni. It was preceded by the single "Ghosts Again" and the track "My Cosmos Is Mine" (released on streaming platforms), and will be the first Depeche Mode studio album to be released after the death of co-founder and keyboardist Andy Fletcher on 26 May 2022. The album will be promoted by the Memento Mori World Tour.

Background
On 26 May 2022, Andy Fletcher unexpectedly died, with the cause of death later being revealed to be aortic dissection. Although work on the album began prior to Fletcher's death, Dave Gahan stated in an interview with NME that Fletcher did not record any material for the album.

In August 2022, a photo of Martin Gore and Dave Gahan in the studio was shared on social media, indicating they were in the studio working on new material.

On 4 October 2022, the band held a press conference in Berlin, announcing their upcoming album titled Memento Mori and a world tour to go along with it. The album is scheduled to be released "towards the end of March" 2023, which will coincide with the tour starting on 23 March 2023.

A description of the album appeared on the band's official website: "The album's 12 tracks chart a vast expansion of moods and textures, from its ominous opening to its closing resolve—running the gamut from paranoia and obsession to catharsis and joy, and hitting myriad points between". The full tracklist of 12 songs was also announced. On Volt Magazin's website, it was confirmed that "Dave Gahan and Martin Gore said there were five finished tracks that didn't make it onto the long player."

Releases
On 3 February 2023, the official Depeche Mode Twitter account announced "Ghosts Again" as the first single which was released on 9 February 2023 with its accompanying music video.

On 9 March 2023, "My Cosmos Is Mine" was released on streaming platforms to further promote the album. It was not released as a single.

Live debuts
On 11 February 2023, the band debuted "Ghosts Again" live in Sanremo, Italy. On 14 February 2023, "Wagging Tongue" was debuted live in La Plaine-Saint-Denis, France. On 19 February 2023, "My Favourite Stranger" was debuted live in Munich, Germany, at a special fan event.

Reception 
Uncut Magazine have said that the album "is their most powerful work this century. It's the sound of a band entering a final act with a renewed sense of purpose, and sharp, sober new focus"

Track listing

Personnel

Depeche Mode
 Dave Gahan
 Martin L. Gore

Additional musicians
 James Ford – programming
 Marta Salogni – programming

Technical
 James Ford – production
 Marta Salogni – production, mixing, engineering
 Greg White – engineer assistance
 Francine Perry – engineer assistance
 Grace Banks – engineer assistance
 Adrian Hierholzer – vocal engineering
 Matt Colton – mastering

Artwork
 Anton Corbijn – cover, all visuals, art direction, design

References

2023 albums
Albums produced by James Ford (musician)
Columbia Records albums
Depeche Mode albums
Mute Records albums
Albums produced by Marta Salogni